St. Stephen's College, one of the prominent colleges accredited under University of Kerala, is situated at Pathanapuram, Kollam, Kerala. The Institution was founded in 1964 by Mar Thoma Dionysius, whose objective was to improve the cultural condition of the people in this remote backward area. The college is affiliated with Kerala University.

The College was declared open by Mar Beselios Augen 1 Catholicose of the East on 8 July 1964. T.C.Joseph, Professor of Botany, Union Christian College, Alwaye, was appointed Principal and the junior College started functioning at Mount Tabor premises Pathanapuram. In 1968 the College was shifted to its present site, in the serene village of Maloor, 6 km. away from Pathanapuram. The College was upgraded in 1978 and now offers Degree and Post graduate courses.

Two of the College's lecturers were ordained; Catholicose Designate and present Manager of the College, Thomas Mar Thimotheos and the Metropolitan of Delhi, Job Mar Philoxenos, Joseph Mar Dionysius were serving the College as Head of the Department of English when they were called up on for Ordination.

Courses offered under various streams 

St Stephen's college offers courses under different streams varying under 3 years and 2 years durations.

3 years courses includes Mathematics, Physics, Chemistry, Botany, Zoology and Biological Techniques and Specimen Preparation, Economics, English, BCom Finance.

2 years courses are lying on master's degrees and it includes MSc in Physics, Mathematics, Chemistry and Zoology (Environmental biology).

Central Library and Information and Digital Library 
The Central Library supports the teaching and research activities of the College. It is the centre of all academic activities of all undergraduate, post -graduate and research studies. The total carpet area of the Central Library is 300 square meters. This consist of reading space with 100 reading seats, stack section, reference section, Journal section and digital library

Co-curricular and extracurricular activities 

St Stephen's college is enriched with wide variety of extracurricular activities for their students listed below:
 College Union
 Career guidance
 Associations
 College union
 Career guidance cell
 Former student's association
 Literary Club
 Reader Forum
 Summer Internship programme in Library and Information
 Extension programme for Rural High School Students
 Grievance redressal cell
 Legal forum
 Music Club
 M.G.O.C.S.M.
 Nature Club
 National Cadet Corps (NCC)
 National Service Scheme (NSS)
 Parent Teacher Association (PTA)
 Students guidance and counselling cell
 Science forum.
 Sargavedi
 Tourism club
 The women's cell
 Tutorials
 Yoga club

Notable alumni
 Mathew Samuel, Journalist

References

External links 

Colleges in Kerala
Universities and colleges in Kollam district
Educational institutions established in 1964
1964 establishments in Kerala
Arts and Science colleges in Kerala
Colleges affiliated to the University of Kerala